John Hollis Patterson (born January 30, 1978) is an American former professional starting pitcher. He played for the Arizona Diamondbacks and the Montreal Expos/Washington Nationals of the Major League Baseball (MLB).

Career
A USA Today prep All-American in his senior year at West Orange-Stark (Texas) High School, Patterson was drafted by the Montreal Expos in the first round (5th overall pick) of the 1996 MLB draft. Montreal lost the draft rights to Patterson on a legal technicality: they sent him a contract offer that was not printed on official team letterhead, and he signed with the Arizona Diamondbacks for $6.075 million. After a solid  rookie season where he had a 3.22 earned run average (ERA), he had a disappointing  season with the Diamondbacks. Patterson was traded back to the Expos prior to the  season in exchange for Randy Choate, a left-handed relief pitcher.

Always filled with immense potential – he featured a fastball in the mid-90s (miles per hour) along with a big curveball and a sharp slider –  Patterson started to realize it while pitching for Montreal in 2004, when he had a 3.57 ERA in April. He got hurt soon after, though, and never regained his form for the rest of the year.

His 15 no decisions were the most among MLB starting pitchers in 2005. On August 4, 2005, he pitched his first career complete game shutout against the Los Angeles Dodgers, with Washington winning 7–0. In 2009, Washington Post baseball writer Dave Sheinin named Patterson's performance the greatest pitching performance in Nationals history at that time.

In , Patterson started the year dismally, going 1–5 in seven starts with an ERA of 7.47. His struggles with right forearm and nerve problems that had begun in 2006 continued. He went back on the disabled list on May 7, 2007, with elbow inflammation. He did not pitch the rest of the season, eventually opting for surgery in September 2007. On March 20, the Nationals released him after four years with the franchise.

On March 24, 2008, Patterson signed a minor league contract with the Texas Rangers. He was released on May 24, 2008. Unable to overcome the pain in his right forearm, he announced his retirement from baseball on January 7, .

Personal life
Patterson lives in Prosper, TX. On November 10, 2007, he married 2005 Miss District of Columbia Shannon Schambeau, who was fourth runner-up in the 2006 Miss America pageant. In 2010 Mrs. Patterson won the Mrs. Texas title associated with the Mrs. America competition.

References

External links

1978 births
Living people
American expatriate baseball players in Canada
Arizona Diamondbacks players
Baseball players at the 1999 Pan American Games
Baseball players from Texas
Brevard County Manatees players
El Paso Diablos players
Harrisburg Senators players
High Desert Mavericks players
Lancaster JetHawks players
Major League Baseball pitchers
Montreal Expos players
New Orleans Zephyrs players
Pan American Games medalists in baseball
Pan American Games silver medalists for the United States
People from Orange, Texas
Potomac Nationals players
South Bend Silver Hawks players
Tucson Sidewinders players
United States national baseball team players
Washington Nationals players
Medalists at the 1999 Pan American Games